Jasper De Buyst (born 24 November 1993) is a Belgian professional racing cyclist, who currently rides for UCI WorldTeam . De Buyst focuses mainly on track cycling, notably the omnium, points race, madison and six-day racing disciplines.

He is the son of professional cyclist  and became professional himself in 2013, at the age of 19. He was named in the start list for the 2015 Vuelta a España and the start list for the 2017 Giro d'Italia. In July 2018, he was named in the start list for the 2018 Tour de France.

Major results

Road

2010
 1st  Road race, National Junior Championships
2011
 1st  Time trial, National Junior Championships
2013
 10th Overall Rás Tailteann
2014
 2nd Druivenkoers Overijse
 5th Grote Prijs Stad Zottegem
 8th Grand Prix Impanis-Van Petegem
2015
 6th Overall Tour de Picardie
2016
 8th Nationale Sluitingsprijs
2017
 1st Binche–Chimay–Binche
 1st Grote Prijs Stad Zottegem
 1st Heistse Pijl
 1st Stage 2 Tour de Wallonie
 3rd Ronde van Drenthe
 3rd Kampioenschap van Vlaanderen
 4th Tour de l'Eurométropole
 4th Dwars door West-Vlaanderen
 4th Rund um Köln
 6th Brussels Cycling Classic
 7th Overall Ster ZLM Toer
 10th Overall Three Days of De Panne
2018
 2nd Omloop van het Houtland
 3rd Trofeo Campos, Porreres, Felanitx, Ses Salines
2019
 3rd Overall Tour of Britain
 3rd Grand Prix de Wallonie
 3rd Primus Classic
 4th Overall ZLM Tour
 5th Road race, National Championships
 5th Overall Danmark Rundt
1st  Points classification
1st Stage 4
 9th Kuurne–Brussels–Kuurne
 9th London–Surrey Classic
2020
 7th Overall Tour de Wallonie
2021
 10th Overall Tour of Belgium
2022
 3rd Egmont Cycling Race
 4th Circuit Franco–Belge
 4th Grote Prijs Jef Scherens
 8th Druivenkoers Overijse
 9th Grand Prix de Wallonie

Grand Tour general classification results timeline

Track

2011
 2nd  Omnium, UEC European Junior Championships
2012
 UEC European Under-23 Championships
2nd  Madison (with Gijs Van Hoecke)
3rd  Team pursuit
 3rd Team pursuit, 2012–13 UCI World Cup, Glasgow
2013
 2013–14 UCI World Cup
1st Omnium, Manchester
2nd Madison (with Kenny De Ketele), Aguascalientes (with Kenny De Ketele)
2nd Omnium, Aguascalientes
 1st  Omnium, UEC European Under-23 Championships
 National Championships
1st  Madison (with Iljo Keisse)
1st  Points race
 International Belgian Open
1st Madison (with Kenny De Ketele)
1st Omnium
 3 Jours d'Aigle
1st Madison (with Kenny De Ketele)
1st Omnium
 1st Six Days of Ghent (with Leif Lampater)
 2nd Six Days of Zürich (with Kenny De Ketele)
2014
 2013–14 UCI World Cup
1st  Overall, Madison (with Kenny De Ketele)
1st  Overall, Omnium
2nd Madison, Guadalajara (with Kenny De Ketele)
2nd Omnium, Guadalajara
 1st Six Days of Ghent (with Kenny De Ketele)
 UEC European Under-23 Championships
2nd  Madison (with Otto Vergaerde)
3rd  Points race
 2nd Six Days of Berlin (with Leif Lampater)
 2nd Six Days of Rotterdam (with Kenny De Ketele)
 3rd Six Days of Zürich (with Kenny De Ketele)
2015
 2nd Omnium, 2014–15 UCI World Cup, Cali
 3rd  Madison, UCI World Championships (with Otto Vergaerde)
 3rd Six Days of Ghent (with Otto Vergaerde)
2018
 3rd Six Days of Ghent (with Tosh Van der Sande)
2019
 1st Six Days of Bremen (with Iljo Keisse)
 2nd Six Days of Ghent (with Tosh Van der Sande)
2021
 2nd Six Days of Ghent (with Roger Kluge)

References

External links

Belgian male cyclists
Belgian track cyclists
Living people
1993 births
People from Asse
Cyclists from Flemish Brabant
Olympic cyclists of Belgium
Cyclists at the 2016 Summer Olympics